One Dollar Short were an Australian punk rock band formed in 1998, and hailing from Terrigal in New South Wales' Central Coast region. They're best known for their debut studio album Eight Days Away which peaked at number 7 on the ARIA charts in 2002.

History
One Dollar Short members are Michael Smith (drums), Trent Crawford (guitar), Tim Flaherty (guitar and backing vocals), Adam Check (bass) and Scott E. Woods (vocals) and they formed in 1998. In 1999, they released their debut EP From the Start on Mushroom Distribution Services.

In March 2001, the band released the EP Board Game which peaked at number 37 on the ARIA Chart, this was followed by the EP Press and Hold in August 2001, which peaked at number 23 on the ARIA Chart. Flaherty left to form another Central Coast-based pop-punk band, Best Kept Secret. He was replaced on guitar briefly by Michael Kemp who departed the band in mid-2001.

In April 2002, the band released "Is This the Part?", the lead single from their debut album Eight Days Away which was released in May 2002. "10 Years" was released in July 2002 as the album's second single. All three released made the ARIA top 100.

In June 2003, the band released "Keep Sake", which peaked at number 52 on the ARIA Chart.

In July 2004, the band released their second studio album, Receiving Transmission, was released along with single, "Some Assembly Required" In early 2005, the band went on hiatus.

In 2011 they reunited playing their first show in six years at Gosford's Coaster Festival on 17 September.

Discography

Studio albums

Compilation albums

Extended plays

Singles

Other appearances

References 

Australian pop punk groups